Carla Panerai (born 4 July 1947) is a retired Italian sprinter who won the 80 hurdles at the 1967 Mediterranean Games. She competed in this event at the 1968 Olympics but failed to reach the final.

References

External links
 

1947 births
Living people
Italian female hurdlers
Olympic athletes of Italy
Athletes (track and field) at the 1968 Summer Olympics
Mediterranean Games gold medalists for Italy
Athletes (track and field) at the 1967 Mediterranean Games
Mediterranean Games medalists in athletics